William Clevland may refer to:

 William Clevland (1664–1734), Royal Navy commander
 William Clevland (king) (died 1758), his son, self-appointed king of the Banana Islands

See also
 William Cleveland (born 1965), American swimmer
 William S. Cleveland (born 1943), American computer scientist
 Bill Cleveland (1902–1974), Louisiana politician